"Leaving Las Vegas" is a song written by David Baerwald and performed by American musician, singer, songwriter and actress Sheryl Crow, that appears on Crow's debut album, Tuesday Night Music Club (1993). It charted within the top 60 in the United States and the top 30 in Canada. Crow performed the song on her live album Sheryl Crow and Friends: Live from Central Park. While the release date likely reflects its physical availability as a single or an official date tied to radio promotion, "Leaving Las Vegas" was in regular rotation at such influential radio stations as KIIS-FM in Los Angeles as early as mid-May 1994—an early sign that Crow would make inroads at Top 40 radio at a time of significant transition for the radio format.

Title
The song's title was based on the semi-autobiographical 1990 novel of the same name by the late John O'Brien, who was a good friend of one of the song's writers, David Baerwald. However, on a performance on the Late Show with David Letterman, Sheryl Crow stated that the song was "autobiographical." This infuriated Baerwald and the rest of the original Tuesday Night Music Club who helped write most of the album. Though O'Brien's suicide occurred soon after this incident, his family came forward to state there was no connection.

Critical reception
Larry Flick from Billboard wrote, "It's time for the critically revered Crow to finally get a moment of radio fame. Bright spot on her "Tuesday Night Music Club" album is a kicky blend of acoustic strumming and percussion. Crow's voice is raw and incredibly expressive, which helps the song's cinematic lyrics pack the powerful punch they do." Troy J. Augusto from Cash Box stated, "This slow-rolling number sports nifty acoustic guitar, dramatic lyrics and loads of Crow’s character-filled, rough-and-tumble vocal stylings. Plus she’s cute as a button and is a natural on stage. What more could you want?" Linda Ryan from the Gavin Report noted that the track "has a slow, hypnotic groove that entranced almost as thoroughly as her dusty, whiskey-soaked vocals." Pan-European magazine Music & Media commented, "Miss Crow doesn't believe in Elvis' tribute to the capital of showbizz, and gets out of town on an adventurous funky synth bassline a lot of singer/songwriters would not dare to think of." A reviewer from People Magazine described it as "a disillusioned, neon-dazzled desert tune".

Music video
The song was accompanied by Crow's first ever promotional video. It was directed by David Hogan, who also shot her video for "All I Wanna Do". The 1993 video shows Crow performing the song with her guitar in the dark, with only some parts of her face lit up. Other scenes include famous Vegas images such as dancers and Elvis Presley lookalikes walking on a highway, "leaving Las Vegas", and Peter Berg driving with Crow in the passenger seat of his convertible. The video uses an edited version of the song.

Track listing
 UK cassette single (Cat. No. 580 644-4)
 "Leaving Las Vegas"
 "Leaving Las Vegas" – Live in Nashville

 UK CD 1 (Cat. No. 580 645-2)
 "Leaving Las Vegas"
 "I Shall Believe" – Live at the Borderline
 "What I Can Do for You" – Live at the Borderline

 UK CD 2 (Cat. No. 580 647-2)
 "Leaving Las Vegas" – Live in Nashville
 "No One Said It Would Be Easy" – Live in Nashville
 "The Na-Na Song" – Live in Nashville

Charts

References

1993 songs
1994 singles
Music videos directed by David Hogan
Sheryl Crow songs
Song recordings produced by Bill Bottrell
Songs about California
Songs about Las Vegas
Songs written by Brian MacLeod (U.S. musician)
Songs written by David Baerwald
Songs written by David Ricketts
Songs written by Kevin Gilbert (musician)
Songs written by Sheryl Crow